This article details the qualifying phase for triathlon at the 2020 Summer Olympics . The competition at these Games will comprise a total of 110 athletes coming from their respective NOCs; each has been allowed to enter a maximum of three. All athletes must undergo a qualifying process to earn a spot for the Games through the Continental Qualification Events, the World Qualification Event, and then the Olympic Qualification List that began on May 11, 2018, and then concludes two years later on the same date.

Summary
Ten NOCs will each earn four quota spots (two per gender) through mixed team qualification. The top seven NOCs in the ITU mixed relay rankings of 31 March 2020 will qualify. NOCs other than those seven can participate in the 2020 ITU Mixed Relay Olympic Qualification Event, with three more teams earning Olympic quota places through that competition. This ensures a minimum field of ten teams in the mixed relay.

The individual rankings of 11 May 2020 will provide quota spots to 31 athletes in each gender. The first 26 spots will go sequentially to the best ranked athletes, subject to a limit of three per NOC (if all three are in the top 30) or two per NOC (if the third would be outside the top 30). For the purposes of this allocation, any NOC that qualified through mixed relay (and thus already has two quota places in each gender) must ignore its two highest-ranked competitors in each gender. Five additional spots will be awarded by continent, to the best-ranked remaining athlete from that continent whose NOC has not already qualified any quota places. A team that qualifies two individuals in both the men's and women's events will then be eligible to join the ten previously qualified teams in the mixed relay event. In 2021, seven further teams achieved at least two quotas in both events, and thus also qualified for mixed relay.

Two places per gender are reserved for the host, Japan. Two final places in each gender are awarded by Tripartite Commission invitation.

Timeline

Men's event

Women's event

References

Qualification for the 2020 Summer Olympics
Triathlon at the 2020 Summer Olympics